Partula pearcekellyi is a species of arboreal gastropod in the family Partulidae.

Anatomy 
Although all material consists of juvenile specimens, they all appeared to be developing an anatomical structure similar to that of Partula hebe.

Distribution 
P. pearcekellyi is known from six specimens collected in the Toahiva Valley, four of which were live-collected juveniles found upon low shrubs and ferns, in leaf litter, and on the stumps of dead trees. During the same collection, 1 juvenile and 26 adult P. hebe specimens were taken alive, suggesting that pearcekellyi was a "rare canopy species".

Etymology 
Partula pearcekellyi was named after Paul Pearce-Kelly of the Zoological Society of London, a renowned conservationist.

References 

pearcekellyi
Gastropods described in 2016